Zoltán Zsitva (26 August 1905 – 1 April 1996) was a Hungarian sprinter. He competed in the men's 400 metres at the 1936 Summer Olympics.

References

External links

1905 births
1996 deaths
Athletes (track and field) at the 1936 Summer Olympics
Hungarian male sprinters
Olympic athletes of Hungary
Place of birth missing